Lake Hope is a small lake lying  north of Mount Flora, close east of the head of Hope Bay, Trinity Peninsula, Antarctica. It was named after nearby Hope Bay by Argentine parties working in the area.

References

Lakes of Antarctica
Bodies of water of Graham Land
Landforms of Trinity Peninsula